America's Islamic Heritage Museum is the principal project of Collections & Stories of American Muslims, Inc. – a Washington, DC, Ward 8 based, non-profit organization dedicated to preserving and fostering educational community-engagement opportunities that provide access to, and understanding of, the history of Muslim Americans.

Organization history
In 1996 Collections & Stories of American Muslims, Inc. (CSAM) was established. In the years that followed CSAM travelled across the country sharing the history of Muslims in America with the public. This included stops at the DuSable Museum of African American History, Harvard University, Howard University, the Malcolm X & Dr. Betty Shabazz Memorial and Educational Center, Rutgers University, the Anacostia Community Museum, Stanford University, University of Florida, University of Illinois at Chicago, University of Illinois at Urbana-Champaign, the University of Pittsburgh and the U.S. Department of State's International Visitor Leadership Program. The exhibition also travelled abroad, visiting Qatar and Nigeria. On April 30, 2011, the museum opened to the public at the former Clara Muhammad School in Washington, DC.

Museum content
Much of the museum's content is displayed on a series of panels covering a diverse set of personalities including Estevanico, Omar ibn Said, Hajj Ali, Yarrow Mamout, and Mohammed Alexander Russell Webb. It makes note of America's unique ethnic groups and migration patterns, including the hard to define Melungeons and the immigration of Bosnian Muslims starting in the 19th century. There is an extensive section on the Nation of Islam with old newspapers, photographs and other memorabilia. The museum also makes note of several towns with Islamic references including Mahomet, IL, Mahomet, TX, Mecca, IN and Elkader, IA.

Hours
The museum is open Tuesday – Saturday from 10:00 am – 5:00 pm, Sunday 12:00 pm – 5:00 pm and closed on Monday.

See also
Islam in the United States
Islam in the Americas

References

External links
www.MuslimsInAmerica.org

2011 establishments in Washington, D.C.
Ethnic museums in Washington, D.C.
Islam in Washington, D.C.
Museums established in 2011
Religious museums in the United States
Islamic museums